Vilangudi may refer to:
 Vilangudi, Madurai, Tamil Nadu
 Vilangudi, Thanjavur, Tamil Nadu